Mistrato (elevation 1900 m) is a town and municipality in the Department of Risaralda, Colombia. The town is located about two hours west of Pereira.

References

Municipalities of Risaralda Department